"Si Yo Me Muero" (Spanish for "If I Die") is a song by Puerto Rican rapper Anuel AA and Puerto Rican producer Mvsis. It was written by Anuel AA and produced by Mvsis, Alexer and AndoConJon. The song was released on November 24, 2022, through Real Hasta la Muerte as the eight single from Anuel AA's fifth studio album LLNM2.

Background 
Anuel AA posted a preview of the video of the single describing it as similar to his best reggaeton bangers "Amanece", "Ayer" and "Sola". On November 26, 2022, Anuel AA announced that "Si Yo Me Muero" would be one of the singles of his upcoming studio album LLNM2.

Commercial performance 
"Si Yo Me Muero" debuted and peaked at number 32 on the US Billboard Hot Latin Songs chart on December 10, 2022. In Spain's official weekly chart, the song debuted at number 79.

Music video 
The music video for "Si Yo Me Muero" was released on November 24, 2022, and was produced by TruViews and Anuel AA. In the video, the Puerto Rican artist gets into the skin of a prisoner. Anuel appears dressed in an orange jumpsuit along with more colleagues. However, Anuel AA is sentenced to death and at the end of it he appears serving his sentence, but not before devoting his last words to the love of his life, his son Pablo Anuel. "Pablito I love you", he says before the end of the video.

Charts

References 

2022 singles
Anuel AA songs
2022 songs